Victorin Lurel (born 20 August 1951 in Vieux-Habitants, Guadeloupe) is a French politician who represented the 4th district of Guadeloupe in the French National Assembly from 2002 to 2012. He also served as the 
President of the Regional Council of the French overseas department of Guadeloupe from 2004 until 2015.  His term began on 15 August 2004 and was renewed on 14 March 2010. In May 2012, he was made the Minister of Overseas France in Jean-Marc Ayrault's cabinet and was replaced in the national assembly by his supplementary candidate Hélène Vainqueur-Christophe. However, on 23 March 2014, he lost the local elections in Vieux-Habitants, and as of 2 April 2014, he was not reappointed to the Valls Cabinet. On December 13, 2015, he lost the regional elections in Guadeloupe.

External links
  page on the French National Assembly website
 Lurel's Blog

1951 births
Living people
People from Vieux-Habitants
Black French politicians
Guadeloupean politicians
Socialist Party (France) politicians
French Ministers of Overseas France
Deputies of the 12th National Assembly of the French Fifth Republic
Deputies of the 13th National Assembly of the French Fifth Republic
Deputies of the 14th National Assembly of the French Fifth Republic
Presidents of the Regional Council of Guadeloupe
Guadeloupean socialists
Paris 2 Panthéon-Assas University alumni